Jason Bernard (born Ronald Carl Johnson, May 17, 1938 – October 16, 1996) was an American actor.

Life and career
Bernard was born in Chicago, Illinois. His first starring role was in the pilot episode of the television series The White Shadow as Jim Willis.  His other well-known television roles are in the television series Cagney & Lacey as Inspector Marquette from 1982 to 1983, Days of Our Lives as Preston Wade in 1982, and a recurring role in the first season of Night Court as Judge Stone's arrogant rival Judge Willard. His big role came in the 1983 NBC miniseries V as Caleb Taylor. Bernard reprised his role in the 1984 sequel V: The Final Battle. In the 1990s Fox comedy series Herman's Head, he played Herman's boss, Mr. Paul Bracken. He appeared in the video games Wing Commander III: Heart of the Tiger and Wing Commander IV: The Price of Freedom as Captain William Eisen.

Bernard's first role in a feature film was a cameo in the Charles Bronson film Death Wish, and his first major role was in the 1974 movie Thomasine & Bushrod. He later appeared in Car Wash, WarGames, No Way Out, While You Were Sleeping, and Blue Thunder.

Bernard made many guest appearances on a variety of television shows, ranging from Starsky & Hutch, Flamingo Road and The Jeffersons to The Flash, Murder, She Wrote, Wiseguy and Partners. He also appeared, as the chief security guard, in The Dukes of Hazzard episode "The Dukes in Hollywood".

He played the blind musician Tyrone Wattell in the film All of Me. Bernard's final appearance was in the 1997 film Liar Liar as Judge Marshall Stevens.

Death
Shortly after the filming of Liar Liar was completed, Bernard suffered a heart attack on October 16, 1996. He had been driving his car in Burbank, California when he was stricken, and was involved in a rear-end accident. Bernard was rushed to Providence St. Joseph's Medical Center in Burbank where he died.  He was survived by his wife Debra and son Jason Jr.  His body was cremated. Both Suddenly and Liar Liar were dedicated in memory of him.

Filmography

Film

Television

Video games

References

External links
 
 

1938 births
1996 deaths
20th-century American male actors
African-American male actors
American male film actors
American male soap opera actors
American male television actors
American male voice actors
Male actors from Chicago
People from Illinois
20th-century African-American people